Henriette Rønde Mikkelsen (born 21 September 1980) is a former Danish team handball player and Olympic champion. She won a gold medal with the Danish national team at the 2004 Summer Olympics in Athens.

She won the Champions League with Viborg HK in 2009.

References

External links
 

1980 births
Living people
Danish female handball players
Olympic gold medalists for Denmark
Handball players at the 2004 Summer Olympics
Viborg HK players
Olympic medalists in handball
Medalists at the 2004 Summer Olympics